The String Quintet No. 1 in B flat major, K. 174, was written by Wolfgang Amadeus Mozart in December 1773.  Unlike Mozart's other viola quintets, which are scored for two violins, two violas and cello, this early work is scored for two violins, two violas and basso. It is inspired by Michael Haydn viola quintets in C major (MH 187) and G major (MH 189), written earlier in the same year.

Mozart composed this quintet a few months following the composition of the Viennese Quartets, K. 168-173 – indeed this work immediately follows that set in the first edition of the Köchel catalogue.

Movements
The work is in standard four movement form:
I. Allegro moderato  in B-flat major
II. Adagio  in E-flat major
III. Menuetto ma Allegro  in B-flat major, with trio in F major
IV. Allegro  in B-flat major

References
Charles Rosen, "The Classical Style: Haydn, Mozart, Beethoven", 1997, Norton

External links

Performance of String Quintet No. 1 by the Orion String Quartet with Ida Kavafian (viola) from the Isabella Stewart Gardner Museum in MP3 format

String quintets by Wolfgang Amadeus Mozart
Compositions in B-flat major
1773 compositions